Steve Jobs: The Lost Interview is a documentary released to theaters in 2012. It consists of the original 70 minute interview that Steve Jobs gave to Robert X. Cringely in 1995 for the PBS documentary, Triumph of the Nerds.

Background

The original interview that Jobs gave to Cringely for Triumph of the Nerds lasted about 70 minutes. Of those 70 minutes, only about 10 were used in Triumph of the Nerds. When Jobs gave this interview in 1995, he was still "two years away from retaking the Chief Executive role at Apple and beginning a run that would transform the Cupertino, Calif.-based Mac maker from loser to leader in the digital economy. At the time of the interview Jobs was one such loser himself: his company, NeXT was stumbling, and rival Bill Gates had taken Apple's ideas and used them to seize control of the personal computer industry."

According to Cringely the original D1 video tape master was lost in shipping in 1995.  When Steve Jobs died in 2011, Triumph of the Nerds director Paul Sen found in his garage a PAL VHS copy of the original unedited interview. Sen informed Cringely that he found this copy and discussed the possibility of releasing it as an independent film. Cringely then contacted Landmark Theatres co-owner Mark Cuban to see if a screening would be possible. Dubbed The Lost Interview, the 70 minute interview screened at 17 theaters around the United States and was later released on DVD in 2012.

Critical response
The Lost Interview received a 100% rating from Rotten Tomatoes (6 fresh reviews).  Robert Koehler of Variety describes it as Jobs at "40, and with an outlook of observing Apple from afar (he had been booted out of the company by Sculley a decade prior and had subsequently founded NeXT)." He is thus "able to bring a perspective he couldn’t have provided at a younger age. Moreover, this p.o.v. [sic] wouldn’t have been possible soon after the interview, since Jobs sold NeXT to Apple six months later and became Apple CEO a year after that." Roger Ebert gave it three stars and noted that "it's raw material for a film, in the form of Jobs speaking in close-up. It's a tribute to the singular popularity of Steve Jobs that he's probably the only talking head people would pay to watch for more than an hour."

Further reading
 Brian Caufield. "Robert X. Cringely On His 'Lost Interview' With Steve Jobs." Forbes, 11 November 2011.

See also
Triumph of the Nerds

Notes

External links
 
 

2012 films
2012 documentary films
American documentary films
Documentary films about computer and internet entrepreneurs
Films about technological impact
Nerd culture
PBS original programming
Works about Apple Inc.
Films about Steve Jobs
2010s English-language films
2010s American films